Khitrovo may refer to:
Bogdan Khitrovo (died 1680), Russian boyar
Nikolai Khitrovo (1779–1826), Russian general
the Khitrovo Gospels, an illuminated manuscript